{{Infobox Christian leader
| type = Cardinal
| honorific-prefix = His Eminence
| name = José Luis Lacunza Maestrojuán, O.A.R.
| honorific-suffix =
| title = Cardinal, Bishop of David
| image = Lacunza Maestrojuán.jpg
| caption =
| province =
| diocese = David
| see =
| appointed = 2 July 1999
| ended = 
| predecessor = Daniel Enrique Núñez Núñez
| successor = 
| ordination = 13 July 1969
| ordained_by = 
| consecration = 18 January 1986
| consecrated_by = José Sebastián Laboa Gallego
| rank = Cardinal-Priest
| cardinal = 14 February 2015
| created_cardinal_by = Pope Francis
| other_post = Cardinal-Priest of San Giuseppe da Copertino
| birth_name =
| birth_date = 
| birth_place = Pamplona, Navarre, Spain
| death_date =
| death_place =
| buried =
| nationality = Spanish & Panamanian
| religion = Roman Catholic
| residence =
| previous_post = 
| parents =
| occupation = 
| profession =
| alma_mater =
| signature =
| coat_of_arms = Coat of arms of Jose Luis Lacunza Maestrojuan.svg
| motto = "Praesumus si prosumus"(We have authority if we serve) 
}}

José Luis Lacunza Maestrojuán, O.A.R. (born 24 February 1944), is a Spanish-born Panamanian friar of the Order of Augustinian Recollects and prelate of the Roman Catholic Church. He has served as Bishop of David, Panama, since 1999.

On 4 January 2015, Pope Francis announced that he would make him a cardinal on 14 February. At that ceremony, he was assigned the Church of San Giuseppe da Copertino as his titular church.

Life
Lacunza was born in Pamplona, Spain, in 1944. He was accepted as a candidate by the Recollect friars and studied at the St. Joseph Minor Seminary which they operated in Artieda, Zaragoza. Following this, he was received into the novitiate of the Order, at the conclusion of which he professed temporary religious vows and received the habit of the Order on 14 September 1964. He was then sent to do his university-level studies, first at the seminary run by the friars at their Monastery of Our Lady of Valentuñana in Sos del Rey Católico, Zaragoza, and later at the Augustinian Seminary of Our Lady of Consolation in Pamplona. Following graduation, he was sent to do his theological studies at the Major Seminary of Our Lady of Pamplona. At the conclusion of his studies, he professed his solemn vows as a full and permanent member of the Order on 16 September 1967 and he was ordained priest on 13 July 1969, both occurring in Pamplona.

After his ordination, Lacunza was sent for a time to teach Latin and Religion at the Colegio Nuestra Señora del Buen Consejo (Our Lady of Good Counsel) in Madrid, administered by the Augustinian friars. Soon after he was sent by his Order to teach at their school the Colegio San Agustín in Panama City, serving as rector from 1979 to 1985. During this period, he also served on the board of directors of the Universidad Católica Santa María La Antigua, as well earning a licentiate in Philosophy and History from the University of Panama with his published thesis, Fundamento Espiritual de la Edad Moderna'' ("The Spiritual Foundations of the Modern Age"). He became rector of the university in 1985 as well as Rector of St. Joseph the Great Seminary, serving the Archdiocese of Panama. He was later appointed as Vicar General of the archdiocese.

Lacunza was appointed an auxiliary bishop of the archdiocese by Pope John Paul II on 30 December 1985, for which he was consecrated on 18 January 1985, with the titular see of Parthenia. On 29 October 1994, Pope John Paul appointed him the Bishop of Chitré. He was transferred to the office of Bishop of David by the same pope on 2 July 1999. He came to serve as President of the Episcopal Conference of Panama (2010–2013) as well as an official of the Latin American Episcopal Conference (CELAM). During this time he achieved national prominence through his mediation of a violent dispute which broke out between the government and the indigenous Ngöbe–Buglé people over the mining of their ancestral lands.

Pope Francis elevated Lacunza to the rank of cardinal in February 2015. He is the first member of his order (established in 1588) and the first Panamanian to be named a cardinal. Cardinal Lacunza presided at the beatification of James Miller (religious brother) on 7 December 2019 in Huehuetenango, Guatemala.

Views
According to notes of the proceedings of the Fourteenth Ordinary General Assembly of the Synod of Bishops in 2015, made public by Archbishop Stanisław Gądecki, Lacunza suggested that the Mosaic Law's sanction of divorce was "merciful" and asked, "Could Peter not be merciful like Moses?"

See also
Cardinals created by Pope Francis

References

External links

 

|

|

1944 births
Living people
People from Pamplona
Augustinian Recollects
Spanish Roman Catholic missionaries
Spanish emigrants to Panama
People from David District
Spanish Roman Catholic bishops in Central America
20th-century Roman Catholic bishops in Panama
21st-century Roman Catholic bishops in Panama
Augustinian Recollect bishops
Augustinian cardinals
Panamanian cardinals
Cardinals created by Pope Francis
Roman Catholic bishops of David
Roman Catholic bishops of Chitré